"I Got the Fire" is a song written by American musician Ronnie Montrose and originally recorded by his band Montrose in 1974. It was later covered by Axe in 1982 and Iron Maiden in 1983.

Recorded versions

Montrose version
The song was originally released by Montrose on their 1974 Paper Money album. The guitar solo was the result of a fortunate accident. As AllMusic noted, it was the result of "a studio screwup which resulted in the bottom-heavy reverberating noise in its intro." The song was one of the last the band recorded with original vocalist Sammy Hagar before he left Montrose to start a solo career.

Iron Maiden version

With a slight title change to "I've Got the Fire", the song was covered by English heavy metal band Iron Maiden as the B-side of their "Flight of Icarus" single in 1983. The band had earlier released a live version of the song as the B-side of their "Sanctuary" single in 1980. The 1983 version was a studio recording.

Axe version
The song was also covered in 1982 by US hard rock band Axe for their album Offering. Axe featured former Blackfoot vocalist Bobby Barth.

Rest in Pieces version
The song was also covered in 1990 by New York hardcore/metal band Rest in Pieces on their album Under My Skin.

References

Montrose (band) songs
1974 songs
Song recordings produced by Ted Templeman